Stănești is a commune located in Giurgiu County, Muntenia, Romania. It is composed of four villages: Bălanu, Ghizdaru, Oncești and Stănești.

1907 Peasants' Revolt
Stănești is the location where the 1907 Romanian Peasants' Revolt reached its highest intensity.  Lieutenant I. Nițulescu was killed here, while Captain Grigore Mareș was wounded after the troops under their command refused their order to fire, and the two officers were attacked by the local peasants.

References

Communes in Giurgiu County
Localities in Muntenia